Sitapur The City Of Gangster is an 2021 Indian Hindi film featuring Ravi Sudha Choudhary, Aparna Mallick and Gaurav Kumar. The FIlm is released on MX player.

Production
Produced under the banner of Rudransh Entertainment, Sitapur The City Of Gangster is a crime drama. The film has been shot in Sitapur, Uttar Pradesh and Mumbai.

Cast
 Ravi Sudha Choudhary
 Gaurav Kumar
 Anchal Pandey
 Aparna Mallick
 Anil Rastogi
 Jitendra Dwivedi
 Shalu Singh
 Shiva Shukla

References

External links
 imdb.com/title/tt14430964
 
 SITAPUR - The City Of Gangsters (2021) | SITAPUR - The City Of Gangsters Movie | SITAPUR - The City Of Gangsters Bollywood Movie Cast & Crew, Release Date, Review, Photos, Videos – Filmiforest
 
 Sitapur The City Of Gangsters (2021) - Movie | Reviews, Cast & Release Date - BookMyShow

Hindi-language drama films
Indian drama films
2021 films